The Monument is a mining town in the locality of Dajarra in the Shire of Cloncurry, Queensland, Australia. It is nicknamed Phosphate Hill.

History 
The town was named by the by Queensland Place Names Board on 1 October 1975. The name refers to a nearby mountain, also called The Monument, which has a rock pillar standing on the top of it.

The Monument State School opened on 15 March 1976 and then closed in December 1978. It reopened on 15 January 1982 and closed in December 1994.

Economy 
The town exists for workers at the IPL Phosphate Mine.

References

External links
 

Towns in Queensland
Shire of Cloncurry